Elisângela Maria Adriano (born July 27, 1972), is a Brazilian shot putter and discus thrower, whose personal best put is 19.30 metres, achieved in July 2001 in Tunja. Her personal best discus throw is 61.96 metres, achieved in May 1998 in São Leopoldo.

Career
Adriano was born in São Paulo.  In 1999 she was suspended by the IAAF for a two-year period, but she was later reinstated before time. She competed in both the discus and shot put at the 2007 World Championships in Athletics, without reaching the final in either event. She also competed in the discus at the 2008 Summer Olympics and the 2009 World Championships in Athletics.

She won the discus and shot put events at the 2009 Brazilian national championships. She holds the South American record in both events. She won her seventh continental discus title at the 2009 South American Championships in Athletics with a championship record of 61 metres. She also won the shot put silver medal behind Chilean Natalia Ducó. She added the 2009 Lusophony Games shot put gold to her list of honours the following month. In the 2010 season, she won the discus gold at the 2010 Ibero-American Championships and later gained her fourteenth national title in the discus at the Troféu Brasil de Atletismo.

She is the Brazilian record holder in the discus throw and also holds the shot put national record both indoors and out.

Achievements

References

External links

 Profile
 

1972 births
Living people
Athletes from São Paulo
Brazilian female shot putters
Brazilian female discus throwers
Athletes (track and field) at the 1996 Summer Olympics
Athletes (track and field) at the 2004 Summer Olympics
Athletes (track and field) at the 2008 Summer Olympics
Athletes (track and field) at the 1991 Pan American Games
Athletes (track and field) at the 1995 Pan American Games
Athletes (track and field) at the 1999 Pan American Games
Athletes (track and field) at the 2003 Pan American Games
Athletes (track and field) at the 2007 Pan American Games
Athletes (track and field) at the 2011 Pan American Games
Pan American Games athletes for Brazil
Olympic athletes of Brazil
Pan American Games gold medalists for Brazil
Pan American Games silver medalists for Brazil
Pan American Games bronze medalists for Brazil
Pan American Games medalists in athletics (track and field)
Universiade medalists in athletics (track and field)
Universiade bronze medalists for Brazil
Medalists at the 1999 Summer Universiade
Medalists at the 2003 Pan American Games
Medalists at the 2007 Pan American Games
Sportspeople from São Paulo (state)
20th-century Brazilian women
21st-century Brazilian women